"Ascension" is a song by British alternative rock virtual band Gorillaz, featuring Vince Staples. The song was released on 23 March 2017. It was released as the third single from their fifth studio album Humanz.

Background and recording
"Ascension" is Gorillaz' third single from their album Humanz and marks the group's first collaboration with American rapper Vince Staples. The song received its premiere on Apple Music's Beats 1 radio station.

The music video leads into Saturnz Barz.  The house from the latter is shown at the end.

Track listing
Digital release single
 "Ascension" – 2:36

Personnel
Damon Albarn – vocals, synthesizer, keyboards, drums, programming
The Twilite Tone – synthesizer, drums, additional vocals
Remi Kabaka Jr. – drum programming
Stephen Sedgwick – recording engineer, mixing engineer
John Davis – mastering engineer
Michael Law Thomas – additional engineering
Vince Staples – vocals
Casey Cuyao – assistant
Samuel Egglenton – assistant
KT Pipal – assistant
The Humanz (Rasul A-Salaam, Starr Busby, Melanie J-B Charles, Drea D'Nur, Giovanni James, Marcus Anthony Johnson, Janelle Kroll, Brandon Markell Holmes, Imani Vonshà) – additional vocals

Charts

References

2017 songs
2017 singles
Gorillaz songs
Songs written by Damon Albarn
Vince Staples songs
Songs written by Vince Staples
Parlophone singles
Warner Records singles
Grime music songs